Jean H. McDowell (later Burnett, born 22 September 1908 in Edinburgh, died 2 February 2000) was a Scottish freestyle swimmer who competed for Great Britain in the 1928 Summer Olympics.

In 1928 she finished fourth the 100 metre freestyle event.

Two years later she won the bronze medal with the Scottish team in 4×100 yards freestyle competition at the 1930 British Empire Games with Cissie Stewart, Ellen King and Jessie McVey). At the Aquatics at the 1934 British Empire Games she won the bronze medal in the 100 yards freestyle contest as well as a bronze medal with the Scottish team in the 3×110 yards medley event (with Margot Hamilton and Margaret McCullum). She won a silver medal at the 1931 European Aquatics Championships as part of the 4×100 metres Freestyle Relay (with Valerie Davies, Phyllis Harding, and Joyce Cooper).

In Scotland she swam for Warrender Baths Club where she won five Scottish Swimming Championships.  She lived for many years in North Berwick East of Edinburgh, and became President of the Scottish Ladies' Golfing Association and Chairman of the British Ladies Golf Union.

References

External links
profile

1908 births
2000 deaths
Sportspeople from Edinburgh
Scottish female swimmers
Scottish female freestyle swimmers
Olympic swimmers of Great Britain
Swimmers at the 1928 Summer Olympics
Swimmers at the 1930 British Empire Games
Swimmers at the 1934 British Empire Games
Commonwealth Games bronze medallists for Scotland
Commonwealth Games medallists in swimming
Medallists at the 1930 British Empire Games
Medallists at the 1934 British Empire Games